"I've Been Around" is a song written and performed by Fats Domino, released as the B-side to the single, "Be My Guest", in 1959. While "Be My Guest" peaked at number eight on the Billboard Hot 100, "I've Been Around" made the chart on its own, peaking at number nineteen on the R&B charts and reaching number thirty-three on the Billboard Hot 100.

Cover versions
The Animals covered it on both their US debut album The Animals, MGM Records – SE 4264, and their UK debut album also called The Animals, Columbia (EMI) 33SX 1669, in 1964.

References

1959 singles
Fats Domino songs
The Animals songs
Songs written by Fats Domino
1959 songs